In mathematics, a square number or perfect square is an integer that is the square of an integer; in other words, it is the product of some integer with itself.

The usual notation for the square of a number  is not the product , but the equivalent exponentiation , usually pronounced as " squared". The name square number comes from the name of the shape. The unit of area is defined as the area of a unit square. Hence, a square with side length  has area . If a square number is represented by n points, the points can be arranged in rows as a square each side of which has the same number of points as the square root of n; thus, square numbers are a type of figurate numbers (other examples being cube numbers and triangular numbers).

Square numbers are non-negative. A non-negative integer is a square number when its square root is again an integer. For example,  so 9 is a square number.

A positive integer that has no square divisors except 1 is called square-free.

The concept of square can be extended to some other number systems. If rational numbers are included, then a square is the ratio of two square integers, and, conversely, the ratio of two square integers is a square, for example, 
.

Starting with 1, there are  square numbers up to and including , where the expression  represents the floor of the number .

Examples
The squares  smaller than 602 = 3600 are:

02 = 0
12 = 1
22 = 4
32 = 9
42 = 16
52 = 25
62 = 36
72 = 49
82 = 64
92 = 81

102 = 100
112 = 121
122 = 144
132 = 169
142 = 196
152 = 225
162 = 256
172 = 289
182 = 324
192 = 361

202 = 400
212 = 441
222 = 484
232 = 529
242 = 576
252 = 625
262 = 676
272 = 729
282 = 784
292 = 841

302 = 900
312 = 961
322 = 1024
332 = 1089
342 = 1156
352 = 1225
362 = 1296
372 = 1369
382 = 1444
392 = 1521

 
402 = 1600 
412 = 1681 
422 = 1764
432 = 1849
442 = 1936
452 = 2025
462 = 2116
472 = 2209
482 = 2304
492 = 2401

 
502 = 2500
512 = 2601 
522 = 2704
532 = 2809
542 = 2916
552 = 3025
562 = 3136
572 = 3249
582 = 3364
592 = 3481

The difference between any perfect square and its predecessor is given by the identity . Equivalently, it is possible to count square numbers by adding together the last square, the last square's root, and the current root, that is, .

Properties
The number m is a square number if and only if one can arrange m points in a square:

This is also equal to the sum of the first  odd numbers as can be seen in the above pictures, where a square results from the previous one by adding an odd number of points (shown in magenta). The formula follows:

For example, .

There are several recursive methods for computing square numbers. Alternatively, the th square number can be calculated from the previous two by doubling the th square, subtracting the th square number, and adding 2, because . For example,
.

For example, since  one has  It follows that  is the only prime number one less than a square. More generally, the difference of the squares of two numbers is the product of their sum and their difference. That is, 

(this is the difference-of-squares formula).

A square number is also the sum of two consecutive triangular numbers. The sum of two consecutive square numbers is a centered square number. Every odd square is also a centered octagonal number.

Another property of a square number is that (except 0) it has an odd number of positive divisors, while other natural numbers have an even number of positive divisors. An integer root is the only divisor that pairs up with itself to yield the square number, while other divisors come in pairs.

Lagrange's four-square theorem states that any positive integer can be written as the sum of four or fewer perfect squares. Three squares are not sufficient for numbers of the form . A positive integer can be represented as a sum of two squares precisely if its prime factorization contains no odd powers of primes of the form . This is generalized by Waring's problem.

In base 10, a square number can end only with digits 0, 1, 4, 5, 6 or 9, as follows:

 if the last digit of a number is 0, its square ends in 00;
 if the last digit of a number is 1 or 9, its square ends in an even digit followed by a 1;
 if the last digit of a number is 2 or 8, its square ends in an even digit followed by a 4;
 if the last digit of a number is 3 or 7, its square ends in an even digit followed by a 9;
 if the last digit of a number is 4 or 6, its square ends in an odd digit followed by a 6; and
 if the last digit of a number is 5, its square ends in 25.

In base 12, a square number can end only with square digits (like in base 12, a prime number can end only with prime digits or 1), that is, 0, 1, 4 or 9, as follows:

 if a number is divisible both by 2 and by 3 (that is, divisible by 6), its square ends in 0, and its preceding digit must be 0 or 3;
 if a number is divisible neither by 2 nor by 3, its square ends in 1, and its preceding digit must be even;
 if a number is divisible by 2, but not by 3, its square ends in 4, and its preceding digit must be 0, 1, 4, 5, 8, or 9; and
 if a number is not divisible by 2, but by 3, its square ends in 9, and its preceding digit must be 0 or 6.

Similar rules can be given for other bases, or for earlier digits (the tens instead of the units digit, for example).  All such rules can be proved by checking a fixed number of cases and using modular arithmetic.

In general, if a prime  divides a square number  then the square of  must also divide ; if  fails to divide , then  is definitely not square. Repeating the divisions of the previous sentence, one concludes that every prime must divide a given perfect square an even number of times (including possibly 0 times). Thus, the number  is a square number if and only if, in its canonical representation, all exponents are even.

Squarity testing can be used as alternative way in factorization of large numbers. Instead of testing for divisibility, test for squarity: for given  and some number , if  is the square of an integer  then  divides . (This is an application of the factorization of a difference of two squares.) For example,  is the square of 3, so consequently  divides 9991.

A square number cannot be a perfect number.

The sum  of the n first square numbers is

The first values of these sums, the square pyramidal numbers, are: 
0, 1, 5, 14, 30, 55, 91, 140, 204, 285, 385, 506, 650, 819, 1015, 1240, 1496, 1785, 2109, 2470, 2870, 3311, 3795, 4324, 4900, 5525, 6201...

The sum of the first odd integers, beginning with one, is a perfect square: 1, 1 + 3, 1 + 3 + 5, 1 + 3 + 5 + 7, etc. This explains Galileo's law of odd numbers: if a body falling from rest covers one unit of distance in the first arbitrary time interval, it covers 3, 5, 7, etc., units of distance in subsequent time intervals of the same length. From s = ut + at2, for u = 0 and constant a (acceleration due to gravity without air resistance); so s is proportional to t2, and the distance from the starting point are consecutive squares for integer values of time elapsed.

The sum of the n first cubes is the square of the sum of the n first positive integers; this is Nicomachus's theorem.

All fourth powers, sixth powers, eighth powers and so on are perfect squares.

A unique relationship with triangular numbers  is:

Odd and even square numbers 

Squares of even numbers are even, and are divisible by 4, since (2n)2 = 4n2. Squares of odd numbers are odd, and are congruent to 1 modulo 8, since (2n + 1)2 = 4n(n + 1) + 1, and n(n + 1) is always even. In other words, all odd square numbers have a remainder of  1 when divided by 8.

Every odd perfect square is a centered octagonal number. The difference between any two odd perfect squares is a multiple of 8. The difference between 1 and any higher odd perfect square always is eight times a triangular number, while the difference between 9 and any higher odd perfect square is eight times a triangular number minus eight. Since all triangular numbers have an odd factor, but no two values of  differ by an amount containing an odd factor, the only perfect square of the form  is 1, and the only perfect square of the form  is 9.

Special cases
 If the number is of the form  where  represents the preceding digits, its square is  where  and represents digits before 25.
 If the number is of the form  where  represents the preceding digits, its square is  where . For example, the square of 70 is 4900.
Example: To calculate the square of 57, 25 + 7 = 32 and 72 = 49, which means 572 = 3249.
 If the number ends in 5, its square will end in 5; similarly for ending in 25, 625, 0625, 90625, ... 8212890625, etc. If the number ends in 6, its square will end in 6, similarly for ending in 76, 376, 9376, 09376, ... 1787109376. For example, the square of 55376 is 3066501376, both ending in 376. (The numbers 5, 6, 25, 76, etc. are called automorphic numbers. They are sequence A003226 in the OEIS.)
 In base 10, the last two digits of square numbers follow a repeating pattern mirror symmetrical around multiples of 25, so for example, 242=576 and 262=676, and in general (25n+x)2-(25n-x)2=100nx. An analogous pattern applies for the last 3 digits around multiples of 250, and so on. As a consequence, of the 100 possible last 2 digits, only 22 of them occur among square numbers (since 00 and 25 are repeated).

See also

 
 
 
 
 Some identities involving several squares

Notes

Further reading 
 Conway, J. H. and Guy, R. K. The Book of Numbers. New York: Springer-Verlag, pp. 30–32, 1996. 
 Kiran Parulekar. Amazing Properties of Squares and Their Calculations. Kiran Anil Parulekar, 2012 https://books.google.com/books?id=njEtt7rfexEC&source=gbs_navlinks_s

Elementary arithmetic
Figurate numbers
Integer sequences
Integers
Number theory
Quadrilaterals
Squares in number theory